State Route 196 (SR 196) is a state highway located within Fayette County, Tennessee. It runs from Piperton north to Gallaway. The entire route is a two-lane rural highway.

Route description

SR 196 begins at US 72 (SR 86) in Piperton, within 1,500 feet of the Tennessee state line with Mississippi. It travels north until it intersects with Old State Line Road near the center of town and turns east then north across the Norfolk Southern Railway. It crosses SR 57 near the commercial center of Piperton. It continues north and crosses the Wolf River. From here it heads in an easterly direction somewhat parallel with the river and then turns sharply north again. After about 10 miles, it crosses SR 193 near the community of Canadaville. From here the road curves through relatively hilly terrain for the area. It intersects US 64 (SR 15) in the community of Hickory Withe. Until a few years ago, the road intersected at US 64, turned west along the highway, and turned north at a separate intersection. However the southern portion was rerouted to line up with the northern portion and a traffic light was added at the intersection. From Hickory Withe, the road continues north, has an interchange with I-40 (Exit 28), crosses the Loosahatchie River, and ends at US 70/US 79 (SR 1) in Gallaway.

Major intersections

References

196
Transportation in Fayette County, Tennessee